Aja is both a surname and a given name; as the latter, it is sometimes rendered as A'ja. Notable people with the name include:

Surname:
Alexandre Aja (born 1978), French filmmaker
David Aja, Spanish comic book artist
Gonzalo Aja (born 1946), Spanish former road bicycle racer
Pablo Aja (born 1986), Mexican footballer

Given name:
Aja Brown (born 1982), American politician
Aja Evans (born 1988), American bobsledder
Aja Huang (born 1978), Taiwanese computer scientist
Aja Jerman (born 1999), Slovenian rhythmic gymnast
Aja Kim, American singer and songwriter
Aja Naomi King (born 1985), American actress
Aja Kong (born 1970), Japanese professional wrestler
Aja Monet (born 1987), American contemporary poet, writer, lyricist, and activist
Aja Volkman (born 1980), American singer and songwriter
Aja West, American musician
 A'ja Wilson (born 1996), American basketball player
Aja (entertainer), contestant on RuPaul's Drag Race (season 9)

See also
 Aja (disambiguation)